The CAFA Youth Championship (U14-17) is an international football competition in Central Asia for the member nations of the Central Asian Football Association (CAFA).

Summary

Men

U-16/U-17

U-14/U-15

Women

U-16/U-17

U-14/U-15

Results

Men
 2017 U15:
 2018 U16:
 2018 U15:
 2019 U16:

2017 U15
July 2017

AFG, TJK, UZB, KGZ, TKM

UZB 2-1 KGZ

AFG 3-2 UZB

2018 U16

UZB 4-1 AFG

UZB 5-0 KGZ

UZB 3-1 TJK

AFG 4-0 KGZ

TJK 2-2 KGZ

AFG 1-0 TJK

2018 U15

July 22, 2018	Turkmenistan	1 : 4	Uzbekistan	18:30	National Stadium, Tashkent

July 22, 2018	Kyrgyz Republic	0 : 2	Iran	21:00	National Stadium, Tashkent

July 22, 2018	Afghanistan	0 : 3	Tajikistan	21:00	Lokomotiv Stadium, Tashkent

July 24, 2018	Uzbekistan	3 : 0	Tajikistan	18:30	Lokomotiv Stadium, Tashkent

July 24, 2018	Afghanistan	2 : 1	Kyrgyz Republic	21:00	Lokomotiv Stadium, Tashkent

July 24, 2018	Turkmenistan	0 : 5	Iran	21:00	Pakhtakor Stadium, Tashkent

July 26, 2018	Tajikistan	2 : 0	Turkmenistan	18:30	National Stadium, Tashkent

July 26, 2018	Iran	1 : 0	Afghanistan	21:00	National Stadium, Tashkent

July 26, 2018	Uzbekistan	2 : 0	Kyrgyz Republic	21:00	Lokomotiv Stadium, Tashkent

July 28, 2018	Kyrgyz Republic	0 : 3	Tajikistan	18:30	National Stadium, Tashkent

July 28, 2018	Iran	1 : 0	Uzbekistan	21:00	National Stadium, Tashkent

July 28, 2018	Afghanistan	3 : 0	Turkmenistan	21:00	Pakhtakor Stadium, Tashkent

July 30, 2018	Tajikistan	0 : 3	Iran	18:30	National Stadium, Tashkent

July 30, 2018	Turkmenistan	0 : 4	Kyrgyz Republic	21:00	Lokomotiv Stadium, Tashkent

July 30, 2018	Uzbekistan	0 : 0	Afghanistan	21:00	National Stadium, Tashkent

2019 U16

July 26, 2019	UZBEKISTAN	1 : 1	TAJIKISTAN	20:30	Dushanbe Central Stadium, Dushanbe

July 26, 2019	TURKMENISTAN	1 : 3	IRAN	18:00	Hisor Central Stadium, Dushanbe

July 26, 2019	AFGHANISTAN	2 : 2	KYRGYZ REPUBLIC	18:00	Dushanbe Central Stadium, Dushanbe

July 27, 2019	TAJIKISTAN	2 : 0	KYRGYZ REPUBLIC	20:30	Dushanbe Central Stadium, Dushanbe

July 27, 2019	AFGHANISTAN	1 : 0	TURKMENISTAN	18:00	Hisor Central Stadium, Dushanbe

July 27, 2019	UZBEKISTAN	1 : 2	IRAN	18:00	Dushanbe Central Stadium, Dushanbe

July 29, 2019	KYRGYZ REPUBLIC	2 : 3	UZBEKISTAN	20:30	Hisor Central Stadium, Dushanbe

July 29, 2019	IRAN	0 : 1	AFGHANISTAN	18:00	Dushanbe Central Stadium, Dushanbe

July 29, 2019	TAJIKISTAN	3 : 0	TURKMENISTAN	18:00	Dushanbe Central Stadium, Dushanbe

July 30, 2019	TURKMENISTAN	1 : 0	KYRGYZ REPUBLIC	20:30	Dushanbe Central Stadium, Dushanbe

July 30, 2019	IRAN	0 : 3	TAJIKISTAN	18:00	Dushanbe Central Stadium, Dushanbe

July 30, 2019	AFGHANISTAN	0 : 3	UZBEKISTAN	18:00	Hisor Central Stadium, Dushanbe

August 1, 2019	KYRGYZ REPUBLIC	0 : 5	IRAN	20:30	Dushanbe Central Stadium, Dushanbe

August 1, 2019	UZBEKISTAN	4 : 0	TAJIKISTAN	18:00	Hisor Central Stadium, Dushanbe

August 1, 2019	TAJIKISTAN	1 : 0	AFGHANISTAN	18:00	Hisor Central Stadium, Dushanbe

Women
 2017 U15:
 2019 U15:
 2021 U17:

2017 U15

27 avgust, yakshanba

19:00 Eron – Qirg'iziston

22:00 Tojikiston – O'zbekiston

28 avgust, dushanba

19:00 Qirg'iziston – O'zbekiston

22:00 Eron – Tojikiston

29 avgust, seshanba

19:00 O'zbekiston – Eron

22:00 Tojikiston – Qirg'iziston

Izoh: Uchrashuv soatlari Toshkent vaqti bilan ko'rsatilgan.

CAFA U-15 Girls Tournament-2017:

Round 1:

Tajikistan - Uzbekistan - 2:8

Iran - Kyrgyzstan - 0:0

Round 2:

Iran - Tajikistan - 3:1

Kyrgyzstan - Uzbekistan - 0:3

Round 3:

Uzbekistan - Iran - 2:0

Tajikistan - Kyrgyzstan - 1:0

2019 U15

13.09.2019	Uzbekistan	2:6	Kyrgyz Republic	Chigatay Stadium

13.09.2019	Iran	4:0	Tajikistan	Chigatay Stadium

14.09.2019	Kyrgyz Republic	0:1	Iran	Chigatay Stadium

14.09.2019	Tajikistan	2:0	Uzbekistan	Chigatay Stadium

16.09.2019	Tajikistan	1:6	Kyrgyz Republic	Chigatay Stadium

16.09.2019	Uzbekistan	2:3	Iran	Chigatay Stadium

Venue: Republican Central Stadium, Dushanbe, Tajikistan

2021 U17

3 July 2021	Iran	6:0	Afghanistan

3 July 2021	Uzbekistan	1:1	Tajikistan

5 July 2021	Iran	0:2 Uzbekistan

5 July 2021	Tajikistan	5:2	Afghanistan

7 July 2021	Uzbekistan	8:0	Afghanistan

7 July 2021	Tajikistan	0:3	Iran

Venue: Republican Central Stadium, Dushanbe, Tajikistan

References

External links
 CAFA
https://globalsportsarchive.com/competition/soccer/afc-u14-girls-regional-championship-2016-east/group-stage/9312/ - AFC Youth

CAFA competitions
Recurring sporting events established in 2017
2017 establishments in Asia